Minot is an unincorporated community located in northern Sunflower County, Mississippi.

References

Unincorporated communities in Sunflower County, Mississippi
Unincorporated communities in Mississippi